Illuminations is the fourth extended play (EP) by English singer Little Boots. It was released in the United States and Canada on 9 June 2009 by Elektra Records. Released as a digital download, the extended play was accompanied by a digital booklet and a music video for the song "New in Town". In Canada, Illuminations was also released on CD.

Track listing

Notes
  signifies an additional producer.

Personnel
Credits adapted from the liner notes of Illuminations.

 Chrissie Abbott – design
 Benedict Cooper – "New in Town" video producer
 Tom Elmhirst – mixing 
 Serban Ghenea – mixing 
 Joe Goddard – production 
 Simon Gogerly – additional production, mixing 
 John Hanes – mix engineering 
 Kid Gloves – production ; mixing 
 Greg Kurstin – production 
 Oli Isaacs – management
 Simon Lord – additional production 
 Sebastian Muravchik – production 
 Jake Nava – "New in Town" video director
 Dan Parry – mixing assistance 
 Ali Renault – production 
 Tim Roberts – assistant mix engineering 
 Karen Tillotson – management

Charts

Release history

References

2009 EPs
Albums produced by Greg Kurstin
Elektra Records EPs
Little Boots albums